Tyson is a 1995 American television film based on the life of American heavyweight boxer Iron Mike Tyson. Directed by Uli Edel, it stars Michael Jai White as Tyson alongside George C. Scott as Cus D'Amato and Paul Winfield as Don King. The film is an adaptation of the 1989 book Fire and Fear: The Inside Story of Iron Mike Tyson by José Torres, a former boxer and former chairman of the New York State Athletic Commission, and depicts events from Tyson's troubled childhood in Brooklyn through his conviction in 1992 for the rape of beauty pageant contestant Desiree Washington.

The film first aired on HBO on April 29, 1995.

Plot

Mike Tyson grows up a troubled youth, who aspires to become a professional boxer. Manager and trainer Cus D'Amato begins turning the young Tyson into an undefeated fighter. However, Tyson becomes a difficult pupil who is often exposed, and slacks off during his training.

D'Amato surrounds Tyson with boxing managers Jimmy Jacobs, Bill Cayton, and trainer Kevin Rooney to help rebuild the boxer's life. D'Amato tells Tyson that as long as he keeps good people nearby, they can keep him out of trouble.

Tyson quickly rises through the ranks, but becomes upset when D'Amato's health deteriorates, and he dies. Jacobs then takes over as Tyson's manager. In 1986, Tyson takes part in the match against Trevor Berbick in Las Vegas at the World Boxing Council heavyweight championship. At twenty years of age, Tyson wins, and becomes the youngest champion in boxing history. In 1987, the match against Tony Tucker takes place, in which Tyson wins, and retains his title.

Tyson marries his pregnant girlfriend, actress Robin Givens. The event is followed by the sad news of Jacobs' death due to leukemia. Cayton takes on the job of managing Tyson. Don King seeks Tyson with an offer to manage his career. Tyson declines, but decided to hire King as his new promoter instead. A battle of words flies between King, Givens, and Cayton in the media, as they accuse each other of swindling Tyson.

When Robin suffers a miscarriage, Tyson slacks off during his training. Rooney, in a fit of frustration, tells him that Robin was never pregnant to begin with. Tyson in response knocks out two of his training fighters.

In 1988, the match against Michael Spinks takes place. Before the match, Cayton learns that he has been fired. Tyson defeats Spinks and everyone cheers on, but Cayton and Rooney are not on the same page. During a television interview with Barbara Walters, Robin unintentionally embarrasses Tyson with his mental health issues.

Meanwhile, police arrive at the home where Robin lives, and where Tyson is throwing a temper tantrum. Robin tells the press that Tyson has become an emotionally abusive husband. She moves out and files for divorce.

In Tokyo, on February 11, 1990, the match against Buster Douglas takes place. Tyson fights hard, but the match ends with Douglas victorious over Tyson by knockout.

In 1991, Tyson is brought to trial for raping beauty pageant contestant, Desiree Washington. He is convicted of rape and criminally deviant conduct, and sentenced to six years in prison, which is served at the Indiana Youth Center. Rooney files a suit against Tyson for civil damages. Upon release in 1995, Tyson announces that he will attempt a comeback. King remains his promoter, but is scheduled to stand trial for insurance fraud.

Cast
 George C. Scott as Constantine "Cus" D'Amato
 Paul Winfield as Don King
 Michael Jai White as Mike "Iron Mike" Tyson
 Regal Hanley as Young Mike Tyson
 James Sikking as Bill Cayton
 Malcolm-Jamal Warner as Rory Holloway
 Tony Lo Bianco as Jimmy Jacobs
 Clark Gregg as Kevin Rooney
 Holt McCallany as Teddy Atlas
 Kristen Wilson as Robin Givens
 Sheila Wills as Ruth Roper
 Lilyan Chauvin as Camille Ewald
 Rebekah Johnson as Desiree Washington
 Reg E. Cathey as Michael Winston
 June Chandler as Barbara Walters
 Michael Jace as Mitch Green
 Duane Davis as James "Buster" Douglas
 Mills Lane as Himself
 Larry Merchant as Himself
 Chuck Hull as Himself

Awards and nominations
Tyson was nominated for the 1996 NAACP Image Award for Outstanding Television Movie, Mini-Series or Dramatic Special.  The award went to another HBO film, The Tuskegee Airmen.

Reception
The movie received mixed reviews from critics.

Video releases
Tyson was released on VHS on January 13, 1998.  A DVD release followed years later, on June 16, 2008.

References

External links

1995 television films
1995 films
1990s biographical drama films
American biographical drama films
American boxing films
Films set in the 1980s
Biographical films about sportspeople
HBO Films films
Cultural depictions of Mike Tyson
Films scored by Stewart Copeland
1990s American films